The 1974 Purdue Boilermakers football team represented Purdue University in the 1974 Big Ten Conference football season. Led by second-year head coach Alex Agase, the Boilermakers compiled an overall record of 4–6–1 with a mark of 3–5 in conference play, placing sixth in the Big Ten. Purdue played home games at Ross–Ade Stadium in West Lafayette, Indiana.

Schedule

Roster

Game summaries

Notre Dame

Duke
 Scott Dierking 19 rushes, 122 yards

Northwestern

    
    
    
    
    
    
    
    
    

Scott Dierking 24 rushes, 127 yards

Iowa
Mike Pruitt 10 rushes, 179 yards

Indiana
Scott Dierking 19 rushes, 129 yards

References

Purdue
Purdue Boilermakers football seasons
Purdue Boilermakers football